In music theory, equivalence class is an equality (=) or equivalence between properties of sets (unordered) or twelve-tone rows (ordered sets). A relation rather than an operation, it may be contrasted with derivation. "It is not surprising that music theorists have different concepts of equivalence [from each other]..." "Indeed, an informal notion of equivalence has always been part of music theory and analysis. Pitch class set theory, however, has adhered to formal definitions of equivalence." Traditionally, octave equivalency is assumed, while inversional, permutational, and transpositional equivalency may or may not be considered (sequences and modulations are techniques of the common practice period which are based on transpositional equivalency; similarity within difference; unity within variety/variety within unity).

A definition of equivalence between two twelve-tone series that Schuijer describes as informal despite its air of mathematical precision, and that shows its writer considered equivalence and equality as synonymous:

Forte (1963, p. 76) similarly uses equivalent to mean identical, "considering two subsets as equivalent when they consisted of the same elements. In such a case, mathematical set theory speaks of the 'equality,' not the 'equivalence,' of sets." However, equality may be considered identical (equivalent in all ways) and thus contrasted with equivalence and similarity (equivalent in one or more ways but not all). For example, the C major scale, G major scale, and the major scale in all keys, are not identical but share transpositional equivalence in that the size of the intervals between scale steps is identical while pitches are not (C major has F while G major has F). The major third and the minor sixth are not identical but share inversional equivalence (an inverted M3 is a m6, an inverted m6 is a M3). A melody with the notes G A B C is not identical to a melody with the notes C B A G, but they share retrograde equivalence.

See also
Enharmonic equivalency
Identity (music)
Invariance (music)
Set theory (music)
Similarity relation (music)

References

Musical set theory